Ogcocephalus notatus, the oval batfish, is a species of batfish in the family Ogcocephalidae. It is found in the tropical western Atlantic Ocean.

Description
The fins have no spines; the dorsal fin has five soft rays, the anal fin has four and the pectoral fins each have at least thirteen rays. The mouth is wide and the pupils of the eyes are oval.

Distribution and habitat
Ogcocephalus notatus is native to the tropical western Atlantic Ocean and the Caribbean Sea. Its range extends from the West Indies and Central America to the mouth of the Amazon in Brazil. Its typical habitat is the seabed, on sand or coral rubble, in open areas with shells and fronds of seaweed or in seagrass meadows. It often partly buries itself in the sediment.

References

Ogcocephalidae
Fish described in 1837